Encrinuridae is a family of trilobite within the order Phacopida that lived in what would be Africa, Asia, Australia, Europe, North America, and South America from the middle Ordovician to the early Devonian from , existing for approximately .

Taxonomy
Encrinuridae was named by Angelin (1854). It was assigned to Phacopida by Gregory Edgecombe (1994). It contains the following genera:

Aegrotocatellus
Alwynulus
Atractocybeloides
Atractopyge
Avalanchurus
Balizoma
Batocara
Bevanopsis
Billevittia
Brianurus
Celtencrinurus
Coronaspis
Coronocephalus
Cromus
Curriella
Cybele
Cybeloides
Cybelurus
Dayongia
Deacybele
Dindymene
Distyrax
Dnestrovites
Elsarella
Encrinuroides
Encrinurus
Eodindymene
Erratencrinurus
Fragiscutum
Frammia
Frencrinuroides
Johntempleia
Kailia
Koksorenus
Langgonia
Lasaguaditas
Libertella
Lyrapyge
Mackenziurus
Mitchellaspis
Nucleurus
Oedicybele
Paracybeloides
Paraencrinurus
Parakailia
Perirehaedulus
Perryus
Physemataspis
Plasiaspis
Prophysemataspis
Prostrix
Rielaspis
Rongxiella
Sinocybele
Staurocephalus
Stiktocybele
Struszia
Tewonia
Walencrinuroides
Wallacia

Fossil distribution
Fossils were found in strata dating from the Arenig to Lochkovian ages. Locations were varied and stretched from Florentine Valley, Tasmania to Xinjiang Province, China to Will County, Illinois.

Sources

 Fossils (Smithsonian Handbooks) by David Ward
 Trilobites by Riccardo Levi-Setti
 Invertebrate Palaeontology and Evolution by E.N.K. Clarkson
 Trilobites: Common Trilobites of North America (A NatureGuide book) by Jasper Burns

External links

Encrinurus in the Paleobiology Database

 
Trilobite families
Ordovician trilobites
Silurian trilobites
Devonian trilobites
Trilobites of Africa
Trilobites of Oceania
Trilobites of Europe
Middle Ordovician first appearances
Early Devonian extinctions
Trilobites of North America
Trilobites of South America